The Soul of the Accordion is a 1935  Argentine tango musical film directed by Mario Soffici and written by José A. Bugliot. It is considered one of the earliest classics of Argentine cinema.

The film starred Libertad Lamarque, Enrique Serrano and Santiago Arrieta.

Plot
A rich countryman sends his son to the city to study. He becomes involved in a romantic relationship with a girl who wants to succeed in singing. The couple go through great sacrifice and renunciation.

The film deals with themes of popular music and radio culture, and introduces the tango song Cambalache, written by Enrique Santos Discépolo.

Cast
Enrique Serrano
Santiago Arrieta
Gogó Andreu
Héctor Calcaño
Charlo
Dora Davis
Ernesto Fama
Miguel Gómez Bao
Libertad Lamarque
Francisco Lomuto
Pepita Muñoz
Domingo Sapelli

References

Further reading
 Di Núbila, Domingo (1998). La época de oro. Historia del cine argentino I, Buenos Aires. Ediciones del Jilguero. .
 Manrupe, Raúl; Portela, María Alejandra (2001). Un diccionario de films argentinos (1930-1995), Buenos Aires, Editorial Corregidor. .
 España, Claudio; Rosado, Miguel Ángel (1984). Medio siglo de cine, 1° edición (en español), Buenos Aires. Editorial Abril S.A. y Editorial del Heraldo S.A.. .

External links

1935 films
1930s Spanish-language films
Argentine black-and-white films
Films directed by Mario Soffici
Tango films
1930s musical drama films
Argentine dance films
Argentine musical drama films
1930s dance films
1935 drama films
1930s Argentine films